The list of Marquette University alumni includes graduates, non-graduate former students, and current students of Marquette University (MU) and Marquette University Law School (MULS), both located in Milwaukee, Wisconsin.

Arts and media

Public figures

Business

Politics and government

Humanities and social sciences

Engineering and sciences

Sports

Niv Berkowitz (born 1986), Israeli basketball player in the Israeli Basketball Premier League
Sandy Cohen (born 1995), American-Israeli professional basketball player for Maccabi Tel Aviv of the Israeli Basketball Premier League and the EuroLeague
Gabe Levin (born 1994), American-Israeli basketball player in the Israeli Basketball Premier League
 Jamil Wilson (born 1990), basketball player for Hapoel Jerusalem in the Israeli Basketball Premier League

References

 
 
Marquette University alumni
Milwaukee-related lists